The AN/PRC-148 Multiband Inter/Intra Team Radio (MBITR) is the most widely fielded handheld multiband, tactical software-defined radio, used by NATO forces around the world. The radio is built by Thales Communications, a subsidiary of the France-based Thales Group. The designation AN/PRC translates to Army/Navy Portable Radio used for two way Communications, according to Joint Electronics Type Designation System guidelines.

The MBITR was developed by the United States Special Operations Command (USSOCOM) and Thales Communications in the 1990s and went into production in 1994, to address the need for a secure multiband handheld radio. It has been more widely deployed with Stryker Combat Teams and with troops deploying to Iraq and Afghanistan. As of August 2007, 100,000 MBITRs have been fielded, over 31,000 of which are in use by the US Army.

Variants

AN/PRC-148 JEM (JTRS Enhanced MBITR)

The standard AN/PRC-148 MBITR can be seamlessly upgraded to the AN/PRC-148 V3/V4 JEM, which is the first radio to be Joint Tactical Radio System (JTRS) Software Communications Architecture 2.2 compliant. The radio is upgraded by replacing the front panel and COMSEC (COMmunications SECurity)  control hardware assemblies. The radio is in production and has been fielded with USSOCOM.

AN/PRC-6809 MBITR Clear
The AN/PRC-6809 MBITR Clear is a variant of the MBITR, made available without encryption. While the PRC-148 includes US Type 1 capabilities in all versions, the PRC-6809 uses Level III Data Encryption Standard, making it available to police, firefighters, and militaries unable to obtain International Traffic in Arms Regulations (ITAR) approval.

Features

 Seamless upgrade to AN/PRC-148 JEM (JTRS Enhanced MBITR) 
 AM/FM 
 Voice/Data 
 HAVEQUICK I/II, SINCGARS ESIP Single Channel and Frequency Hopping, ANDVT 
 Analog Narrowband Capable (12.5 kHz) 
 2 and 20 Meter Immersible Variants 
 CTCSS Tones 
 Retransmission Between Handheld Radios (with special purpose filters and cable) 
 JITC Tested

Interoperability

The MBITR can communicate with the following devices:
AN/PRC-68 
AN/PRC-117F 
AN/PRC-77 
AN/PRC-113 
AN/PRC-137 
AN/PRC-139 
AN/PRC-152 
AN/PRC-119 
AN/VRC-12 
AN/PSC-5 
Motorola LST-5B/C 
Motorola MX300 Series 
Motorola Saber 
Motorola XTS 3000 
Motorola XTS 5000

Replacement
While the JEM has passed government certification, it is an evolutionary platform, and not fully compatible with all specifications of JTRS. The fully compatible system is the JTRS HMS, (Handheld, Manpack and Small form-fit) being developed by General Dynamics, Thales Communications, BAE Systems, and Rockwell Collins are all prime subcontractors. The HMS is expected to be an integral part in the US Army's Future Combat Systems program.

Competition
The MBITR's primary competition comes from Harris Corporation's AN/PRC-152 software defined radio, which has also received SCA and NSA certification.

Accessories
 RCU Remote Control Unit with GPS
 H2OPS
 ViaSat Data Controller (VDC-600, VDC-800, or VDC-850)
 Melanie H_N
 Vehicle Adapter

ViaSat Data Controller (VDC-600, VDC-800, or VDC-850)
The ViaSat Data Controller (VDC-600, VDC-800, or VDC-850) acts as a Networking Interface Card (NIC), enabling seamless integration of IP-based applications into a point-to-point RF network. The device is built by Viasat.

Thales Melanie H_N

MELANIE allows collecting GPS data from user nodes (also in ANDVT - Advanced Narrowband Digital Voice Terminal radio mode) and to provide a robust military interface to connect MBITR to personal computers (or Android tablets). MELANIE is connected to an external connector of MBITR and forwards data/audio connection for C4OPS and for RCU. Data connection by USB or RS-232. Typical Blue Force Tracking (BFT) configuration of a MELANIE network consists of at least a Headquarter station plus user nodes. MELANIE Handheld is able to send its own position over the VHF or SAT network while exchanging data (Chat, File transfer, Video, TR@CER, etc.). In transparent mode it has a throughput of 13.5 kbit/s with FEC. The device is built by Thales Italia Chieti Site, a subsidiary of the Thales Group.

Thales Vehicle Adapter
The compact, rugged Vehicle Adapters and Vehicle Adapter Amplifiers for the combat-proven AN/PRC-148 family of multiband inter/intra team radios expand critical communication capabilities and open up a broad range of secure and anti-jamming voice and data applications. Easily mounted in air, land, or sea vehicles, they provide power amplification for range extension while recharging the installed AN/PRC-148 radios.

See also
PRC-152
Tactical Vest Antenna System

External links
Thales Communications, Inc. - Tactical Communications Products

References

Military radio systems of the United States
Military electronics of the United States
Military equipment introduced in the 1990s